Elita Krūmiņa (born 21 November 1965 in Jelgava) has been the auditor general of Latvia since 21 January 2013. Prior to becoming auditor general, Krūmiņa was a member of the council of Latvia's state audit office; she became a member in 2005 after spending six years at the Latvian Ministry of Finance.

References

External links

People from Jelgava
1965 births
Living people
Government accounting officials
20th-century Latvian people